Cyclopentadienylthallium, also known as thallium cyclopentadienide, is an organothallium compound with formula C5H5Tl. This light yellow solid is insoluble in most organic solvents, but sublimes readily.  It is used as a precursor to transition metal and main group cyclopentadienyl complexes, as well as organic cyclopentadiene derivatives.

Preparation and structure
Cyclopentadienylthallium is prepared by the reaction of thallium(I) sulfate, sodium hydroxide, and cyclopentadiene:

 Tl2SO4 + 2 NaOH → 2 TlOH + Na2SO4
 TlOH + C5H6 → TlC5H5 + H2O

The compound adopts a polymeric structure, consisting of infinite chains of bent metallocenes.  The Tl---Tl---Tl angles are 130°.  Upon sublimation, the polymer cracks into monomers of C5v symmetry.

Applications
Compared to other cyclopentadienyl (Cp) transfer reagents, such as cyclopentadienyl sodium, CpMgBr and Cp2Mg, cyclopentadienylthallium is less air sensitive.  It is also much less of a reducing agent.

References

Cyclopentadienyl complexes
Organothallium compounds
Half sandwich compounds
Thallium(I) compounds